Clare Bodensteiner (born 31 October 1984 in Christchurch) is a New Zealand female basketball player. She played college basketball at Stanford University, and was also a member of the New Zealand women's national basketball team, known as the Tall Ferns, at the 2008 Summer Olympics in Beijing, China.

Bodensteiner graduated from Stanford University, where she played college basketball for the Stanford Cardinal. She also received an undergraduate degree in psychology, and a master of science degree major in education. She also tried out for the New Zealand national team in 2008, until she was officially elected to play for the Olympics, along with former Stanford teammate Jillian Harmon, shortly after weeks of training.

Bodensteiner is currently resided in Rupert, Idaho since she came to the United States, and works as an assistant coach for the Loyola Ramblers basketball team.

References

External links

NBC 2008 Olympics profile

1984 births
Living people
New Zealand women's basketball players
Basketball players at the 2008 Summer Olympics
Olympic basketball players of New Zealand
Stanford Cardinal women's basketball players
People from Rupert, Idaho